Albarradas Sign Language is an indigenous village sign language of Mexico. It arose approximately 150 years ago in the Zapotec villages of Santa Catarina Albarradas, San Antonio Albarradas and possibly one other nearby town, due to a high incidence of congenital deafness.

See also
Santa Catarina Albarradas Zapotec

References

Village sign languages
Sign languages of Mexico